Comanthera is a genus of plants in the Eriocaulaceae. It is native to tropical South America.

The name was first published in 1937 with one species (C. linderi, now called C. kegeliana). More recent authors  reexamined the group and concluded that several other species should be transferred into Comanthera.

Comanthera aciphylla (Bong.) L.R.Parra & Giul. - Minas Gerais
Comanthera aurifibrata (Silveira) L.R.Parra & Giul. - Brazil, Colombia
Comanthera bahiensis (Moldenke) L.R.Parra & Giul. - Morro do Chapéu in Bahia
Comanthera bisulcata (Körn.) L.R.Parra & Giul. - Bahia, Minas Gerais, Goiás
Comanthera brasiliana (Giul.) L.R.Parra & Giul - Minas Gerais
Comanthera brunnea Echtern. - Minas Gerais
Comanthera caespitosa (Wikstr.) L.R.Parra & Giul - Minas Gerais
Comanthera centauroides (Bong.) L.R.Parra & Giul - Pará, Minas Gerais, Mato Grosso
Comanthera chrysolepis (Silveira) L.R.Parra & Giul - Minas Gerais
Comanthera ciliata (Silveira) L.R.Parra & Giul - Minas Gerais
Comanthera cipoensis (Ruhland) L.R.Parra & Giul - Serra do Cipó in Minas Gerais
Comanthera circinnata (Bong.) L.R.Parra & Giul - Serra do Cipó in Minas Gerais
Comanthera curralensis (Moldenke) L.R.Parra & Giul - Bahia
Comanthera dealbata (Silveira) L.R.Parra & Giul - Minas Gerais
Comanthera elegans (Bong.) L.R.Parra & Giul - Minas Gerais
Comanthera elegantula (Ruhland) L.R.Parra & Giul - Minas Gerais
Comanthera euschemus (Ruhland) L.R.Parra & Giul - Pará, Goiás
Comanthera flexuosa (Silveira) L.R.Parra & Giul - Minas Gerais
Comanthera floccosa (Moldenke) L.R.Parra & Giul - Bahia
Comanthera giuliettiae L.R.Parra - Bahia
Comanthera glabra (Silveira) L.R.Parra & Giul - Minas Gerais
Comanthera harleyi (Moldenke) L.R.Parra & Giul - Bahia
Comanthera hatschbachii (Moldenke) L.R.Parra & Giul - Bahia
Comanthera imbricata (Körn.) L.R.Parra & Giul - Bahia
Comanthera jenmanii (Gleason) L.R.Parra & Giul - Guyana, Venezuela
Comanthera kegeliana (Körn.) Moldenke - Guyana, Venezuela, Suriname, Brazil
Comanthera lanosa L.R.Parra & Giul - Bahia
Comanthera linearis (Ruhland) L.R.Parra & Giul - Minas Gerais
Comanthera magnifica (Giul.) L.R.Parra & Giul - Minas Gerais
Comanthera mucugensis (Giul.) L.R.Parra & Giul - Bahia
Comanthera nitida (Bong.) L.R.Parra & Giul - Minas Gerais, Rio de Janeiro
Comanthera nivea (Bong.) L.R.Parra & Giul - southeastern Brazil
Comanthera paepalophylla (Silveira) L.R.Parra & Giul - Bahia, Minas Gerais
Comanthera reflexa (Gleason) L.R.Parra & Giul - - Colombia, Venezuela, Brazil
Comanthera retroflexa L.R.Parra & Giul - Bahia
Comanthera rupprechtiana (Körn.) L.R.Parra & Giul - Minas Gerais
Comanthera squarrosa (Ruhland) L.R.Parra & Giul - Minas Gerais
Comanthera suberosa (Giul.) L.R.Parra & Giul - Minas Gerais
Comanthera vernonioides (Kunth) L.R.Parra & Giul - eastern Brazil
Comanthera xantholepis (Silveira) L.R.Parra & Giul - Minas Gerais
Comanthera xeranthemoides (Bong.) L.R.Parra & Giul - Bolivia, Venezuela, Colombia, Guyana, Brazil

References

Eriocaulaceae